The Servants' Characters Act 1792 was an act of the Parliament of Great Britain.  It came about following a petition to parliament by London and Westminster residents, concerned over a perceived rise in the use of false references by servants to gain employment.  The use of false references to gain entry to a house had been linked to a number of burglaries across the country.  The act criminalised the creation of false references by employers or servants and the misrepresentation by servants of their employment history.  Only a single successful prosecution was made under the act, in 1910, and it was repealed in 2008.

Background 
The act arose from a petition to the Parliament of Great Britain from a number of householders in the cities of London and Westminster.  The petitioners were concerned about the use of false references by servants to gain employment; one of the petitioners claimed to have been burgled after a servant, employed on the basis of a false reference, passed information on his house to a gang of criminals.  The provision of oral or written references (referred to as characters) from previous employers was the primary means of vetting potential servants at the time.  In addition to the petitioner's case a number of burglaries in the country were thought to be linked to criminals who entered employment as servants under false pretences.  The petition was referred to a committee of the House of Commons who proposed the act.

Description and operation 
The preamble of the act noted that the offences it created were "of great magnitude and continually increasing, and no sufficient remedy has hitherto been applied".  The act criminalised the creation of false references "given personally or in writing by evil disposed persons being or pretending to be the master, mistress, retainer or superintendent of such servants, or by persons who have actually retained such servants in their respective service, contrary to truth and justice and to the peace and security of his Majesty's subjects".  It also created offences of impersonating an employer or related person to provide a false reference for a servant, for a servant to misrepresent the nature or duration of employment, for a servant to amend or alter any written reference or for a servant to falsely deny any previous period of employment as a servant.

Paragraph 8 of the act allowed for a form of King's evidence, providing a legal indemnity against prosecution for servants using false references who informed against others.  A 1956 paper by barrister John Nevin considered that the act allowed for broader prosecution of offences than that under the Forgery Act 1913, then in force.  Under the Forgery Act it was only an offence to produce a false instrument, a document that purported to be something it was not, rather than a false statement, a document containing lies.

The punishment for offences under the act was initially a fine of £20 and, if not paid, imprisonment with hard labour.  The punishments were amended by the Justices of the Peace Act 1949, Summary Jurisdiction Act 1884, the Bail Act 1976, Criminal Justice Act 1948 and by the Courts Act 1971 to reflect changes in the judicial system and prison legislation.  Parts of the act relating to providing character references in writing were repealed by the Forgery and Counterfeiting Act 1981, leaving only the offences of making false references orally.  Only one successful prosecution came through the act, R v Costello and Bishop (1910) against an employer giving a false reference.

Repeal 
The act was recommended for repeal by the eighteenth report on statute law repeals published by the Law Commission and the Scottish Law Commission in January 2008.  The law commissions contended that the law was obsolete, superseded by more recent laws.  The law commissions thought that a criminal offence of providing misleading references was out of step with current practice, where such matters were prosecuted under civil law (for example as a tort of deceit). Where a criminal prosecution is desired they noted that the Fraud Act 2006 allows for the prosecution of the provider or user of false references to gain employment as fraud by false representation, where the intent is to make a financial gain.

The entire act was repealed by the Statute Law (Repeals) Act 2008 on 21 July 2008.

References 

Great Britain Acts of Parliament 1792
Repealed Great Britain Acts of Parliament
United Kingdom labour law